The International Award of Merit in Structural Engineering is presented to people for outstanding contributions in the field of structural engineering, with special reference to usefulness for society by the International Association for Bridge and Structural Engineering

Fields of endeavour may include: planning, design, construction, materials, equipment, education, research, government, management. The first Award was presented in 1976.

Awardees 
Source IABSE

 2020: Ahseen Kareem, USA
 2019: Niels Jørgen Gimsing, Denmark
 2018: Tristram Carfrae, UK
 2017: Juan José Arenas, Spain
 2016: no award
 2015: Jose Calavera, Spain
 2014: William F. Baker, USA
 2013: Theodossios Tassios, Greece
 2012: Hai-Fan Xiang, China
 2011: Leslie E. Robertson, USA
 2010: Man-Chung Tang, USA
 2009: Christian Menn, Switzerland
 2008: Tom Paulay, New Zealand
 2007: Manabu Ito, Japan and Spain
 2006: Javier Manterola, Spain
 2005: Jean-Marie Cremer, Belgium
 2004: Chander Alimchandani, India
 2003: Michel Virlogeux, France
 2002: Ian Liddell, UK
 2001: John W. Fisher, USA
 2000: John E. Breen, USA
 1998: Peter Head, UK
 1997: Bruno Thürlimann, Switzerland
 1996: Alan G. Davenport, Canada
 1994: T. N. Subbarao, India
 1995: Mamoru Kawaguchi, Japan
 1993: Jean Muller, France
 1992: Leo Finzi, Italy
 1991: Jörg Schlaich, Germany

See also
 List of engineering awards

References

External links
 IABSE webpage

Structural engineering awards
International awards